Moulvi Mazaullah Musakhail is a Pakistani politician who was a Member of the Provincial Assembly of Balochistan, from May 2013 to May 2018.

Early life and education
He was born on 1 January 1954 in Musakhel District.

He has received Islamic education from Madrasa.

Political career

He was elected to the Provincial Assembly of Balochistan as a candidate of Jamiat Ulema-e Islam (F) from Constituency PB-15 Musakhail in 2013 Pakistani general election. He received 8,451 votes and defeated a candidate of Jamiat Ulama-e-Islam Nazryati.

References

Living people
Balochistan MPAs 2013–2018
1954 births
Jamiat Ulema-e-Islam (F) politicians